Seevaratnam Pulidevan was the  head of the LTTE’s Peace Secretariat.He conducted peace negotiations on behalf of the LTTE.He was killed along with Balasingham Nadesan and Ramesh during the White Flag incident

References 

2009 deaths
Liberation Tigers of Tamil Eelam members
Sri Lankan Tamil rebels
Sri Lankan rebels